The 1994 Meath Intermediate Football Championship is the 68th edition of the Meath GAA's premier club Gaelic football tournament for intermediate graded teams in County Meath, Ireland. The tournament consists of 20 teams. The championship starts with a group stage and then progresses to a knock out stage.

This was Cortown's debut in the middle grade as they were promoted from the J.F.C. after claiming the 1993 Meath Junior Football Championship title.

On 9 October 1994, Kilmainhamwood claimed their 2nd Intermediate championship title when they defeated Simonstown Gaels 2–11 to 1–8 in the final at Pairc Tailteann.

Team changes

The following teams have changed division since the 1993 championship season.

From I.F.C.
Promoted to S.F.C.
 Carnaross -  (Intermediate Champions)

Relegated to 1994 J.A.F.C.
 None

To I.F.C.
Regraded from S.F.C.
 None

Promoted from 1993 J.A.F.C.
 Cortown  - (Junior 'A' Champions)

Group stage
There are 4 groups called Group A, B, C and D. The top two finishers in all groups will qualify for the quarter finals.

Group A

Round 1:
 Cortown 1–11, 2-8 Rathkenny, Martry, 10/4/1994,
 Ballivor 4-13, 0-3 Dunsany, Summerhill, 10/4/1994,
 Meath Hill - Bye,

Round 2:
 Cortown 2–7, 2-7 Ballivor, Athboy, 8/5/1994,
 Rathkenny 1-12, 1-7 Meath Hill, Castletown, 8/5/1994,
 Dunsany - Bye,

Round 3:
 Dunsany 0-14, 0-8 Meath Hill, Kilberry, 28/5/1994,
 Rathkenny 0–12, 0-12 Ballivor, Kells, 29/5/1994,
 Cortown - Bye,

Round 4:
 Cortown 2-11, 0-9 Meath Hill, Castletown, 11/6/1994,
 Rathkenny w, l Dunsany, Walterstown, 21/6/1994,
 Ballivor - Bye,

Round 5:
 Ballivor w, l Meath Hill, Martry, 10/7/1994,
 Cortown 5-12, 0-3 Dunsany, Kilberry, 16/8/1994,
 Rathkenny - Bye,

Quarter-Final Playoffs:
 Cortown 0–9, 1-6 Ballivor, Athboy, 24/8/1994,
 Cortown 3-17, 0-6 Ballivor, Athboy, 29/8/1994,
 Rathkenny 1-8, 1-6 Ballivor, Kells, 4/9/1994,

Group B

Round 1:
 Dunshaughlin 3-20, 0-2 Moynalty, Pairc Tailteann, 16/4/1994,
 Syddan w, l Donaghmore, Duleek, 16/4/1994,
 Simonstown Gaels - Bye,

Round 2:
 Moynalty 1-10, 2-6 Syddan, Carlanstown, 7/5/1994,
 Simonstown Gaels 1-14, 1-2 Donaghmore, Skryne, 8/5/1994,
 Dunshaughlin - Bye,

Round 3:
 Simonstown Gaels 3-6, 1-6 Dunshaughlin, Skryne, 28/5/1994,
 Donaghmore 2-11, 1-12 Moynalty, Kilmessan, 29/5/1994,
 Syddan - Bye,

Round 4:
 Dunshaughlin 0-11, 0-8 Donaghmore, Dunboyne, 2/7/1994,
 Simonstown Gaels 1-9, 1-5 Syddan, Nobber, 10/7/1994,
 Moynalty - Bye,

Round 5:
 Simonstown Gaels w, l Moynalty, Kells, 20/8/1994,
 Dunshaughlin w, l Syddan, Seneschalstown, 20/8/1994,
 Donaghmore - Bye,

Group C

Round 1:
 St. Patrick's 1-6, 0-7 St. Mary's, Bellewstown, 10/4/1994,
 Gaeil Colmcille 'B' w, l Navan O'Mahonys 'B', Martry, 16/4/1994,
 St. Ultan's - Bye,

Round 2:
 St. Mary's 2-8, 0-9 St. Ultan's, Walterstown, 30/4/1994,
 St. Patrick's w, l Gaeil Colmcille 'B', Walterstown, 8/5/1994,
 Navan O'Mahonys 'B' - Bye,

Round 3:
 St. Ultan's 1-15, 0-7 Navan O'Mahonys 'B', Dunderry, 14/5/1994,
 St. Mary's w, l Gaeil Colmcille 'B', Seneschalstown, 27/5/1994,
 St. Patrick's - Bye,

Round 4:
 St. Patrick's 0-10, 0-7 St. Ultan's, Rathkenny, 28/5/1994,
 St. Mary's 2-13, 0-6 Navan O'Mahonys 'B', Skryne, 2/7/1994,
 Gaeil Colmcille 'B' - Bye,

Round 5:
 St. Ultan's w, l Gaeil Colmcille 'B', Kilberry, 2/7/1994,
 St. Patrick's w, l Navan O'Mahonys 'B', 
 St. Mary's - Bye,

Group D

Round 1:
 Castletown 0-8, 0-5 Nobber, Rathkenny, 16/4/1994,
 Kilmainhamwood 2-15, 0-9 Athboy, Kilberry, 16/4/1994,
 Ballinabrackey - Bye,

Round 2:
 Kilmainhamwood 2-8, 0-6 Castletown, Nobber, 8/5/1994,
 Ballinabrackey 1–8, 1-8 Athboy, Summerhill, 27/5/1994,
 Nobber - Bye,

Round 3:
 Ballinabrackey w, l Nobber, Dunderry, 19/6/1994,
 Athboy w, l Castletown, Kells, 19/6/1994,
 Kilmainhamwood - Bye,

Round 4:
 Athboy 2-10, 0-10 Nobber, Kells, 9/7/1994,
 Kilmainhamwood 1-15, 1-9 Ballinabrackey, Athboy, 10/7/1994,
 Castletown - Bye,

Round 5:
 Ballinabrackey w, l Castletown, Dunderry, 28/7/1994,
 Kilmainhamwood w, l Nobber,
 Athboy - Bye,

Quarter-Final Playoffs:
 Ballinabrackey 2-10, 1-7 Athboy, Ballivor, 20/8/1994,

Knock-out Stages

Finals
The teams in the quarter-finals are the top two finishers from each group.

Quarter-Final:
 Simonstown Gaels 0-13, 0-6 St. Mary's, Pairc Tailteann, 28/8/1994,
 Dunshaughlin 1-6, 0-2 St. Patrick's, Skryne, 28/8/1994,
 Cortown 2-10, 0-12 Ballinabrackey, Trim, 4/9/1994,
 Kilmainhamwood 0-14, 0-7 Rathkenny, Kells, 11/9/1994,

Semi-Final:
 Simonstown Gaels 0–13, 1-10 Cortown, Kells, 17/9/1994,
 Kilmainhamwood 0-10, 0-7 Dunshaughlin, Seneschalstown, 17/9/1994,

Semi-Final Replay:
 Simonstown Gaels w, l Cortown, Pairc Tailteann, 24/9/1994,

Final:
 Kilmainhamwood 2-11, 1-8 Simonstown Gaels, Pairc Tailteann, 9/10/1994,

References

External links

Meath Intermediate Football Championship
Meath Intermediate Football Championship